The Man Who Wouldn't Stand Up won the 2013 International Rubery Book Award and is a 2012 satirical novel by the American writer Jacob M. Appel. "Shortly after the attacks of September 11, 2001, in the United States," the author explained, "I knew I wanted to write a book against the backlash of those events. It took me three years to complete…. At the time, I did not think it would take me another eight years to find a publisher. I came close many times, but American publishers appeared to fear the political content of the work and several of them admitted this candidly or even asked me to 'sanitize' the novel." In 2012, it won the Dundee International Book Prize, one of the UK's most lucrative prizes for an unpublished debut novel, and was published by Cargo Publishing.

The title refers to the protagonist, a middle-aged botanist named Arnold Brinkman, who takes his nephew to Yankee Stadium for a baseball game. During the seventh-inning stretch, fans are asked to rise for the singing of "God Bless America" in honor of two Bronx soldiers killed in the line of duty. Arnold remains seated. "When the stadium cameras inevitably find him," wrote reviewer Steve Donoghue, "and put his picture up on the jumbo-tron for the fans and all the home viewers to see, Arnold does the unforgivable: he sticks out his tongue."

See also
 2012 in literature
 Scottish literature

Notes

References

2012 American novels
English-language novels
Novels about the September 11 attacks
War on Terror books
Books on anti-terrorism policy of the United States
Censored books
2012 debut novels